Cove is a village in the Scottish Borders area of Scotland, northwest of the Scotland/England border. Cove is close to Cockburnspath, Dunglass, Innerwick, Oldhamstocks, Bilsdean, and, further afield, Dunbar and Eyemouth.

The nearest railway station is Dunbar, which is on the main East Coast line from London Kings Cross to Edinburgh. There are regular trains both from Dunbar to Edinburgh and southwards to Berwick-upon-Tweed.  The nearest bus station is in Cockburnspath which takes passengers north to Edinburgh terminating at St Andrews Square, and southwards, terminating in Berwick.

The rocks that form the approach to the harbour are limestones and sandstones of Carboniferous age. Beyond the fault, older strata of the Old Red Sandstone of Devonian age can be seen.

The natural harbour was improved in 1831 by the building of a breakwater. Access is via an unusual tunnel which was excavated by hand. The pick marks are clear to see.

Eleven men from Cove died in the great Eyemouth disaster of 1881. There is a memorial at the top of the cliffs.

The village has been described  by The AA Guide to the British Coast as having more of a Cornish than Scottish air about it. It has no school, shops or post office, although it was knocked down to build new holiday homes. There is a shop and post office nearby in the village of Cockburnspath which also has a school.  For amenities, such as a pool or a gym, people need to travel to Dunbar, which is also has an ASDA supermarket.

The nearby beaches of Pease Bay and Thorntonloch are used for surfing.

Cove is privately owned by the architect Ben Tindall and the Cove Harbour Conservation Ltd.

The Southern Upland Way passes through Cove along the headland and the road in Cove.

See also
List of places in the Scottish Borders
List of places in Scotland
Eyemouth disaster

References

External links

SCRAN image: Cove Harbour, Berwickshire
RCAHMS/Canmore record for Cockburnspath railway station; Cove
Gazetteer for Scotland: Cove Harbour
Scottish Borders Council planning request
GEOGRAPH image for Cove, Berwickshire
Cockburnspath and Cove Community Council
Cove Harbour

Villages in the Scottish Borders